Chrysops appendiculata is a species of deer fly in the family Tabanidae.

Distribution
Australia.

References

Tabanidae
Insects described in 1847
Diptera of Australasia
Taxa named by Pierre-Justin-Marie Macquart